How to Survive a Robot Uprising: Tips on Defending Yourself Against the Coming Rebellion is a semi-satirical book by Daniel Wilson published in November 2005.

The book gives tongue-in-cheek advice on how one can survive in the event that robots become too intelligent and rebel against the human race.  How to Survive a Robot Uprising is partially based on scientific fact, and is a prime example of deadpan humor.

Wired magazine gave it a 2006 Rave Award, calling it "equal parts sci-fi send-up and technical primer". Maclean's called the book "very funny and highly informative."

In 2007, the American Library Association designated the book a 2007 ALA “Popular Paperback for Young Adults”.

Wilson received a Ph.D. in Robotics from Carnegie Mellon University's Robotics Institute in Pittsburgh, Pennsylvania.

In the summer of 2005, Paramount Pictures optioned film rights to the book and hired Thomas Lennon and Robert Ben Garant (both members of The State comedy troupe and co-creators of the Reno 911! television series) to write a script based on the book. On April 26, 2006 comedian Mike Myers signed with Paramount to star in the movie adaptation.

See also
Butlerian Jihad
Carbon chauvinism
Battlestar Galactica
The Matrix
The Terminator
I, Robot (film)
The Zombie Survival Guide
Cybernetic revolt
9 (2009 animated film)
Robopocalypse

Notes

External links
Official Site
HUAR

2005 non-fiction books
Science fiction books
Comedy books
Books about survival skills